The 1992–93 season was the 58th season in existence for Real Zaragoza competed in La Liga for 15th consecutive year, Copa del Rey and in the UEFA Cup for the first time since the 1989-90 edition.

Summary
During summer the club became a SAD (Anonymous Sport Society) with Pikolin group grabbing a majority of shareholders electing Alfonso Solans as its new President.  The newly arrived board transferred in several players such as: 1990 FIFA World Cup Champion Left back Defender Andreas Brehme from Internazionale (after failed movements to FC Barcelona and Atletico Madrid with his friends Johan Cruijff and Bernd Schuster respectively), Santiago Aragon from Real Madrid and midfielder Nayim from Tottenham Hotspur. Owing to a weak defensive line the squad finished on 9th spot in League far away from European spots for the next year. Meanwhile in UEFA Cup the squad reached the Eightfinals only to be eliminated by future runners-up Borussia Dortmund thanks to a great performance of Stephane Chapuisat. 

Finally, in Copa del Rey the team reached the Final for the first time since 1986 only to be defeated by Real Madrid 0-2 at Estadio Luis Casanova in front of 42,000 fans.

Squad

Transfers

Winter

Competitions

La Liga

League table

Position by round

Matches

Copa del Rey

Third round
bye as 1992-93 UEFA Cup qualified team.

Fourth round
bye as 1992-93 UEFA Cup qualified team.

Fifth round
bye as 1992-93 UEFA Cup qualified team.

Eightfinals

Quarterfinals

Semifinals

Final

UEFA Cup

First round

Second round

Eightfinals

Statistics

Players statistics

References

Real Zaragoza
Real Zaragoza seasons